Sport Benfica e Castelo Branco, commonly referred to as Benfica e Castelo Branco is a semi-professional football club based in Castelo Branco.

Founded on 24 March 1924, the club has traditionally worn a red and white home kit since inception. The team has played its home matches in the 12,000-capacity Estádio Municipal Vale do Romeiro in the outskirts of Castelo Branco since 1956.

Current squad

Honours
Terceira Divisão
 Winners (4): 1959–60, 2000–01, 2003–04, 2011–12

AF Castelo Branco First Division
 Winners (9): 1953–54, 1954–55, 1955–56, 1956–57, 1957–58, 1958–59, 1968–69, 1973–74, 1975–76

AF Castelo Branco Taça de Honra
 Winners (1): 1979–80

Taça Doutor Julio Goulão
 Winners (1): 1979–80

League and cup history

Last updated: 1 July 2013
2DS = Segunda Divisão; 3DS = Terceira Divisão
Pos. = Position; Pl = Match played; W = Win; D = Draw; L = Lost; GS = Goal scored; GA = Goal against; P = Points

References

External links
 Official website 
 Benfica Castelo Branco at Soccerway
 Profile at ZeroZero
 Profile at ForaDeJogo

Football clubs in Portugal
Castelo Branco, Portugal
Association football clubs established in 1924
1924 establishments in Portugal
Liga Portugal 2 clubs